Pedro Miguel da Costa Álvaro (born 2 March 2000) is a Portuguese professional footballer who plays as a centre-back for Estoril.

Club career
Born in Sandomil, Seia, Álvaro started playing football at local club Seia FC at 9 years old . After being scouted and moving to Benfica's youth system in 2011, he made his professional debut with Benfica B in a goalless away draw to Leixões in LigaPro on 26 November 2017. Having spent 10 years playing for Benfica, he currently plays in Estoril Praia.

Honours
Benfica
UEFA Youth League runner-up: 2016–17

References

External links
 
 
 

2000 births
Living people
People from Seia
Sportspeople from Guarda District
Portuguese footballers
Portugal youth international footballers
S.L. Benfica B players
Belenenses SAD players
G.D. Estoril Praia players
Liga Portugal 2 players
Primeira Liga players
Association football defenders